Steinar Bastesen (born 26 March 1945) is a Norwegian politician. A fisherman and whaler, Bastesen was first elected to the Norwegian Storting in 1997 as an independent candidate. In 1999, he participated in forming the Coastal Party (Kystpartiet). He headed the party from 1999 to March 2005, when internal disparity among the members forced him to give up his leadership. Bastesen kept his seat in the Storting until the 2005 election.

Bastesen was born in Dønna to fisherman Ingvart Meyer Bastesen and housewife Karly Edvarda, née Edvardsen. He first participated in whaling in 1953, at the age of 8. He bought his first whaler ship in 1971. He held elected positions in the organization for Norway's fishermen, Norges Fiskarlag and in the sale's organization for fish, Norges Råfisklag. He was leader of an organization for whalers, Norges Småkvalfangerlag, from 1984 to 1996.

Bastesen became known for his vigorous advocacy of whaling, and usually appears on television wearing a seal-fur vest. In 1997, Canadian anti-whaling activist Paul Watson claimed in a NRK interview that Bastesen had threatened to kill him. Bastesen vehemently denied the allegation, and sued NRK for defamation of character by letting the interview air. Bastesen won in the Oslo District Court, but lost in the appeal court in 2002 as the court found that Watson's accusation was of journalistic interest.

In 1998, Bastesen said that the whale Keiko, known from the Free Willy films, should be killed and the meat sent to Africa as foreign aid. This was his response to hearing that millions of dollars were being spent on preparing the whale for returning to the wild.

He was involved in local politics, first for the Centre Party and later for the Conservative Party, before he later became a member of parliament for the Non-Partisan Deputies (1997-2001) and the Coastal Party (2001-2005).

Bastesen has an award from the Norwegian Society for Sea Rescue for rescuing people on a shipwrecked ship during a severe storm in 1971.

References 

1945 births
Coastal Party politicians
Critics of animal rights
Members of the Storting
Norwegian people in whaling
Living people
21st-century Norwegian politicians
20th-century Norwegian politicians
People from Dønna